Donald James Ross Campbell (born 24 June 1974) is a former Zimbabwean first-class cricketer. He played as a wicket-keeper and is the younger brother of Zimbabwean Test cricketer Alistair Campbell. Donald captained Harare Sports Club during his career.

External links

1974 births
Living people
Mashonaland cricketers
Zimbabwean cricketers
Zimbabwean people of Scottish descent
Wicket-keepers